Kollayil (Malayalam: കൊല്ലായിൽ)is a village in Thiruvananthapuram district in the state of Kerala, India.Kollayil Post Office PIN code is 691541 There are 3 schools in Kollayil area.

Schools in Kollayil 
 Kollayil LPS - This is an Upper Primary School established in 1962. This school situates at Kollayil near the Thiruvananthapuram-Schencotta road. There are about 700 students and 22 teachers at this school.
 Jawahar LPS Kurakkodu - This is a Lower Primary School established in 1976.
 Sree Narayana Upper Primary School KOLLAYIL
 vollyballcourt and fishmarket kollayil

Demographics
 India census, Kollayil had a population of 25148 with 12324 males and 12824 females.

References

Villages in Thiruvananthapuram district